"Don't Worry, Be Happy" is a 1988 song by American musician Bobby McFerrin, released as the first single from his fourth album, Simple Pleasures (1988). It was the first a cappella song to reach number-one on the Billboard Hot 100 chart, a position it held for two weeks. Originally released in conjunction with the film Cocktail, the song peaked at number-one on September 24, 1988, displacing "Sweet Child o' Mine" by Guns N' Roses.

The song also peaked at number 11 on the Billboard Hot Black Singles chart and number seven on the Billboard Hot Adult Contemporary Tracks chart. It was also a hit in the United Kingdom, reaching number two during its fifth week on the UK Singles Chart. In Canada, the song reached number-one in its eighth week. One critic noted it as a "formula for facing life's trials". 

At the 1989 Grammy Awards, "Don't Worry, Be Happy" won the awards for Song of the Year, Record of the Year, and Best Male Pop Vocal Performance.

Background

Indian mystic Meher Baba (1894–1969) often used the expression "Don't worry, be happy" when cabling his followers in the West, and the expression was printed on inspirational cards and posters during the 1960s. In 1988, McFerrin noticed a similar poster in the apartment of jazz duo Tuck & Patti in San Francisco, and he was inspired by the expression's charm and simplicity. He wrote the song that was included in the soundtrack of the movie Cocktail and became a hit single the next year.

Composition

The "instruments" in the a cappella song are entirely overdubbed voice parts and other sounds made by McFerrin, using no instruments at all; McFerrin also sings with an affected accent, though he stated that "I hate to go so far as to say it's Jamaican. It was heavily influenced by Juan's Mexican Restaurant, which was just around the corner from the studio." "Don't Worry, Be Happy" is written in the key of B major.

Critical reception
Kieran McCarthy of AllMusic expected that the song would "probably remain prevalent in pop culture as long as humans speak English and play music." Pan-European magazine Music & Media picked it as Single of the Week. They wrote, "Cool a capella by this unusual artist. Uncomplicated music stripped down to the basics, but missing absolutely nothing. This recording will appeal to everybody who is on the lookout for something different. With the reggae-style vocals and a snappy rhythm, this Linda Goldstein produced US top 10 single is a novelty record of considerable substance."

Music video
The comedic original music video for the song, directed by Drew Takahashi, stars McFerrin, Robin Williams, and Bill Irwin, and is somewhat shorter than the album version.

Awards
At the 1989 Grammy Awards, "Don't Worry, Be Happy" won the awards for Song of the Year, Record of the Year, and Best Male Pop Vocal Performance.

Impact and legacy
The song is ranked No. 31 on VH1's "100 Greatest One-Hit Wonders of the '80s" and also appears on Rolling Stones list of the 15 Best Whistling Songs of All Time. It was also featured at #301 in the Recording Industry of America and the National Endowment for the Arts' 'Songs of the Century' in 2001.

However, in 2011, "Don't Worry, Be Happy" was named as the worst song of all time by Village Voice critic Michael Musto, and it topped Q100 DJ Bert Weiss's list of tracks he would forever ban from radio. In the "50 Worst Songs Ever", Blender said that "it's difficult to think of a song more likely to plunge you into suicidal despondency than this", and also lambasted its "appalling" lyrics.

Charts

Weekly charts

Year-end charts

Certifications and sales

Use by the George Bush campaign

The song was used in George H. W. Bush's 1988 U.S. presidential election as Bush's 1988 official presidential campaign song, without Bobby McFerrin's permission or endorsement. In reaction, McFerrin (a Democrat) publicly protested that particular use of his song, including stating that he was going to vote against Bush, and completely dropped the song from his own performance repertoire, to make the point even clearer. The Bush campaign then reportedly desisted from further use of the song.

See also
 Big Mouth Billy Bass, a toy which "sang" a version of this song

References

External links

 Lyrics of this song on Bobby McFerrin's official website

1988 debut singles
1988 songs
Grammy Award for Record of the Year
Grammy Award for Song of the Year
Grammy Award for Best Male Pop Vocal Performance
Billboard Hot 100 number-one singles
Cashbox number-one singles
Number-one singles in Australia
Number-one singles in Iceland
European Hot 100 Singles number-one singles
RPM Top Singles number-one singles
A cappella songs
Meher Baba
Manhattan Records singles
EMI Records singles